Air Zimbabwe (Pvt) Ltd (operating as Air Zimbabwe) is the national carrier of Zimbabwe, headquartered on the property of Robert Gabriel Mugabe International Airport, in Harare. From its hub at Robert Gabriel Mugabe International Airport, the carrier used to operate a network within southern Africa that also included Asia and London-Gatwick. Following financial difficulties, Air Zimbabwe ceased operations in late . Some flights were restarted on a discontinuous basis in  that year.

The company has been a member of the International Air Transport Association, and of the African Airlines Association since 1981. , it is owned by the Government of Zimbabwe.

History

Early years

The entity that eventually became Air Zimbabwe formally came into being on 1 September 1967, when the Government of Rhodesia created 'Air Rhodesia Corporation' to succeed Air Rhodesia, a wholly owned subsidiary of Central African Airways Corporation (CAAC) that had existed since 1964 as a domestic airline within Rhodesia. Following the dissolution of CAAC at the end of 1967, Air Rhodesia inherited CAAC operations, as well as a fleet of Boeing, DC-3 and Viscount aircraft. It became the short-lived 'Air Zimbabwe Rhodesia' in 1978, and finally 'Air Zimbabwe' in April 1980 when the Republic of Zimbabwe was formed. Services connecting Harare with South Africa (Durban and Johannesburg) had been operated before the country gained its independence. The company had leased a Boeing 707 from South African Airways until , when three Boeing 707-320Bs were bought from Lufthansa. That year, flights to Frankfurt were inaugurated. The airline recorded a ZWL 330,000 (£220,000) profit for the fiscal year that ended on 30 June 1980.

During 1982, a service to Perth and Sydney commenced; it was run in cooperation with Qantas and flown with Qantas Boeing 747SP aircraft. The cargo carrier continued its operations under the Affretair brand. During 1983, Air Zimbabwe became a member of the International Air Transport Association (IATA); it also extended its regional routes to Gaborone, Lilongwe, Lusaka and Nairobi.

By , Air Zimbabwe had 1,443 employees and the fleet comprised five Boeing 707-320Bs and seven Viscount 700s. At this time, the airline flew domestic services linking Harare with Buffalo Range, Bulawayo, Gweru, Hwange National Park, Kariba, Masvingo and Victoria Falls, regional services to Blantyre, Durban, Gaborone, Johannesburg, Lusaka and Nairobi, and intercontinental flights to Athens, Frankfurt and London; the Harare–Perth–Sydney route offered using Qantas Boeing 747SP aircraft was flown in association with Air Zimbabwe. The additional capacity permitted route extensions to Dar es Salaam, Manzini, Maputo and Mauritius. A BAe 146-200 was bought in 1987 for domestic routes. Also in 1987, the airline announced its intentions to acquire Ilyushin Il-62s and -86s and Yakovlev Yak-42s instead of Western-built aircraft. These plans never materialised and Air Zimbabwe placed an order for two Boeing 767-200s. With registration Z-WPE and named "Victoria Falls", the first Boeing 767-200ER entered the fleet in November 1989. The Boeing 707 was retired from serving long-haul routes shortly afterwards; these aircraft were still used to cover regional routes. The Viscount was definitely withdrawn from service in November 1989. The airline phased in the second 767-200ER (Z-WPF, named "Chimanimani") in late 1990. Two Fokker 50s were ordered in April 1995; they were delivered a month later.

Financial turmoil and service disruption
In , it was revealed that the company had been temporarily suspended by the IATA over unpaid debts. In late , the prices of Air Zimbabwe tickets increased up to 500%, partly due to the inflation in the country rising to over 1,000%—at that time the Zimbabwean Central Bank stated that it could not continue supporting Air Zimbabwe and other money-losing state companies—and partly because the airline was in need of foreign currency to pay for fuel, spare parts, and catering. A foreign exchange crisis in the country led to the cancellation of the carrier's operations in late 2005, following the lack of hard currency to pay for the fuel. In 2006, it was disclosed that passenger numbers had fallen from 1 million in 1999 to 23,000 in 2005.

In , the airline was suspended from IATA's international financial and booking system over unpaid booking fees. It was announced in early  that the government would absorb a  million debt in order to make the company more attractive to foreign investors.

In , the airline came under judicial management. Following a failed revival attempt, in which the pilots refused to resume domestic services over  million in unpaid salaries and allowances, it was announced on  that Air Zimbabwe would be grounded indefinitely. In March of the same year, the government of Zimbabwe established Air Zimbabwe Private Limited as the new owner of the carrier after disbanding the airline's former parastatal owner Air Zimbabwe Holdings and absorbing a  million debt. The airline was reactivated in late , with a reduced flight scheme serving the Harare–Johannesburg route. Approximately 600 employees out of more than 1,000 had been laid off by late  as part of cost-cutting measures aimed at recapitalising the airline. The Zimbabwe Tourism Authority revealed in  that the airline's market share suffered a steep decrease in the year ending , with a 0.8% participation in this period down from 27% in the same period of 2009.

In May 2017 Air Zimbabwe was added to the list of air carriers banned in the European Union as a result of not meeting EU safety standards.

, Air Zimbabwe's debts were estimated to be  million. On 8 June 2018, it was reported that Air Zimbabwe has debts of more than $300 million and can no longer fly to most destinations due to threats by debtors to impound its aircraft. With mounting debt and only three of its aircraft operational, the airline was put under administration on 6 October 2018.

On 26 March 2020, the airline was forced to suspend all flights indefinitely due to the COVID-19 pandemic. The airline was subsequently forced to put all employees on unpaid leave and is in the process of creating a post-pandemic masterplan.

Corporate affairs

Ownership and management
Since March 2012 the airline has been operated through Air Zimbabwe Private Limited, which is wholly owned by the Zimbabwe Government, although there have long been plans to privatise the airline in some degree.

Chipo Dyanda is the airline chairwoman, . In October 2016, Simba Chikore was appointed to be the Chief Operating Officer (COO), amid much controversy and accusations of nepotism as he is also the son-in-law to Zimbabwean President Robert Mugabe. Simba resigned from Air Zimbabwe in November 2017.

Business trends
Air Zimbabwe has been loss-making for many years, with irregular services. Although the airline is government owned, full annual reports are not published. Audited accounts were last presented in 2008, and despite press reports that audits have been completed for the years 2009 to 2012, these do not appear to have been published.

Various performance figures have been publicly professed, but are subject to change and may therefore not be accurate (for example, the number of employees have allegedly remained fixed in recent years).  Recent financial figures (2014 to 2018) are from the 'Reconstruction Report' by the airline administrator Grant Thornton, as reported by the Zimbabwe Independent.  Publicised figures (for years ending 31 December):

Destinations

Network development
Likewise, the carrier added Kuala Lumpur to its network in 2009. A capacity boost was disclosed to occur on the Harare–London-Gatwick route effective 1 April 2011. The Harare–London route that was once served by both British Airways and Air Zimbabwe had become one of the most lucrative routes for Air Zimbabwe since the British carrier discontinued the service in 2007.

As part of its recovery strategy, the airline in April 2020 has launched a comprehensive revival plan. The airline is planning new routes from Victoria Falls, as well as from Harare.
Victoria Falls will connect local resorts (Buffalo Range, Kariba, Matopos, and Hwange) and regional destinations in Windhoek (Namibia), Maun (Botswana) and Cape Town (South Africa). 
The main Harare hub will introduce regular flights to Lusaka (Zambia), Cape Town, Dubai (UAE) and Lubumbashi and Kinshasa (both in the Democratic Republic of Congo). through to Dubai in the United Arab Emirates (UAE).

In February 2011 the airline temporarily suspended its flights to Johannesburg over likely impoundments of its planes by creditors due to unpaid debts. Regional and domestic services were suspended for a short period in May 2011, following both the grounding of its Boeing 737-200 fleet by the Civil Aviation Authority of Zimbabwe (CAAZ) over maintenance concerns, and the impoundment of a leased aircraft from Zambezi Airlines over a  unpaid debt. Operations resumed in late , following an agreement between the two airlines, yet the aircraft was repossessed by the owner in late . In mid-, flights to London and South Africa were temporarily suspended because of a due debt with fuel suppliers. Owing both to the grounding of the 737-200 fleet and to fuel shortages in the country, domestic services were suspended and regional flights were operated on an irregular basis. Operations were discontinued again in late , this time due to a pilots' strike, resuming in mid-September after a 50-day-long strike. Once again, overseas and domestic flights were temporarily cancelled in early , this time owing to an unpaid debt with fuel providers.

Overview
Following is a list of destinations Air Zimbabwe flies to, according to its scheduled services, . Terminated destinations are also shown.

Fleet

Current fleet
, the Air Zimbabwe fleet consists of the following aircraft:

Historic fleet
The airline previously operated the following aircraft:

 BAe 146-100

 Boeing 707-320B
 Boeing 737-500
 Fokker 50
 Viscount 700
 Viscount 800

Fleet development
Two Viscount 800s were purchased from Dan-Air in the early 1980s, to replace the Viscount 700s inherited from Air Rhodesia that were near the end of their life; these aircraft flew for the company until their retirement in 1989.

The initial fleet of five Boeing 707s sourced from Lufthansa replaced the Boeing 720 aircraft used by Air Rhodesia. These 707s joined the Vickers Viscount fleet, that was strengthened by the addition of two Viscounts 810s from Dan Air. The airline saw the incorporation of the Boeing 737-200 into the fleet in 1985. Long-haul operations that were once operated with the 707s were gradually shifted to the newly acquired Boeing 767-200ER aircraft; the first of them entered the fleet in late 1989. A British Aerospace BAe 146 was added to the fleet from the Zimbabwean Air force in the 1980s. Leased Fokker 50s were used from 1995 but proved unsuitable to the hot and high conditions and were returned to the lessor.

In late 2010 the airline announced it had ordered two Airbus A340-500s to serve the Harare–Beijing and Harare–London routes; the order was later cancelled after the company failed to raise the money. In late , Air Zimbabwe was forced to return the Boeing 737-500 it was hiring from Zambezi Airlines to partially compensate the lack of equipment following the grounding of its Boeing 737-200 fleet, as it was unable to afford the costs of its leasing. The aircraft was mainly used to operate the Harare–Johannesburg route; it was disclosed the company had to fly the route using one of their Boeing 767s.

Despite versions for the acquisition of new aircraft were officially declined in July 2011 owing to a precarious cash position, it was disclosed that the airline bought an Airbus A340-500 and an Airbus A320, both new, in August 2011. , there had been discrepant versions over the acquisition of new Airbus aircraft, since the secretary of the Zimbabwean Ministry of Transport has denied the transaction, but there exist records for the delivery of an A320 to the company.

On 20 January 2020, the airline received the first of 2 Boeing 777-200 jets from Malaysia Airlines.

Accidents and incidents
According to the Aviation Safety Network, the company has not had a fatal accident since Air Rhodesia was renamed Air Zimbabwe in 1980. The only hull-loss accident is listed below.

July 1984: A Vickers 756D Viscount, registration Z-YNI, was damaged beyond repair in an incident on the grounds of Harare International Airport. It was withdrawn from service and transferred to the airport fire department for use as a training aid.

In June 1999 the Chicago Tribune published a story, later withdrawn, in which the reporter Gaby Plattner claimed she had flown from Kariba to Hwange on an Air Zimbabwe service, and that the flight departed without a co-pilot, and during the flight the pilot was locked out of the cockpit, and had to use an axe to chop down the door. The newspaper later stated that this story was untrue. The carrier then sued the Chicago Tribune and also CNN, after it ran a story claiming it was the most dangerous airline in the world.

See also
 Transportation in Zimbabwe

References

Bibliography

External links

 

Airlines banned in the European Union
Airlines of Zimbabwe
Government-owned airlines
Airlines established in 1967
1967 establishments in Rhodesia
1980 establishments in Zimbabwe
Airlines established in 1980
Companies based in Harare